Stan Lee's Superhumans is a documentary television series that debuted from August 5, 2010 to September 17, 2014 on History. It is hosted by Marvel comic book superhero creator Stan Lee and follows contortionist Daniel Browning Smith, "the most flexible man in the world", as he searches the globe for real-life superhumans – people with extraordinary physical or mental abilities.

Series overview

List of episodes

Season One (2010)

Season Two (2011–2013)

Season Three (2014)

References 
(deadlink)

External links 

  (deadlink)
 

2010s American documentary television series
History (American TV channel) original programming
2010 American television series debuts
Works by Stan Lee